The Valley of the Tombs is a necropolis at the west of Palmyra, Syria. It is one of the three necropoleis present around the ancient city. It is one kilometre long (0.62 mi), and easily recognizable by its tower-tombs, among which the former towers of Atenatan, Kitot, Iamblichus and Elahbel where the earliest finds of silk were made and that were destroyed by ISIS in 2015.

Tower-tombs

Tower of Atenatan
As worded by Anna Witecka, "The tower-tomb of Atenatan is the earliest dated tomb in the Palmyrene necropolis. The date of the tower, established by an inscription, is 9 B.C. and the date of the fall of Palmyra in 273 A.D. must be accepted as the terminus ante quem. Built of irregular stones, the tower is quadrangular and narrows toward the top." As described by J. M. C. Toynbee, the tomb "has a facade of limestone blocks and a panelled stone door, composed of two wings that turn on pivots, above which is the slab for a bilingual Greek and Palmyrene (Araméenne) inscription."

Tower of Kitot
The Tower of Kitot dated from 40 AD.

Tower of Iamblichus
The Tomb of Iamblichus dated to AD 81 It is about 58 feet high.

Tower of Elahbel

See also
 Hypogeum of Yarhai

References

Sources

 
 

Palmyra